Rashaun Demier Freeman (born December 15, 1984) is an American professional basketball player. He played college basketball at the University of Massachusetts. He was a prospect for the 2007 NBA draft. He received a tryout for the Memphis Grizzlies.

College basketball 
Freeman finished 4th in career points for the Minutemen with 1,744 and third in career rebounds with 998. He was on the Atlantic 10 First Team for three years in a row. He scored a career high 31 points vs St. Bonaventure. Throughout his UMass career he averaged 14.8 points and 8.5 rebounds. He was a Senior team tri-captain with Stéphane Lasme and Brandon Thomas.

Professional career 
Freeman's professional career began at Hermine de Nantes Atlantique in the French Pro B (2nd Division), before being signed by the French Pro A (1st Division) club BCM Gravelines for the following season. In the 2009–10 season, he played for EnBW Ludwigsburg in the German Bundesliga. Freeman then moved to Belgium, signed by VOO Verviers-Pepinster, and had a short stint in Puerto Rico, where he played for Gallitos de Isabela. For the 2011–12 season, he was signed by Israeli club Maccabi Habik'a.

In July 2013, Freeman signed with Barak Netanya.

In August 2014, he signed with BC Tsmoki-Minsk.

On April 24, 2017, Freeman signed with Maccabi Haifa.

References

External links 
Eurobasket.com profile
RealGM.com profile
DraftExpress profile
Bio at UMassHoops.com

1984 births
Living people
American expatriate basketball people in Argentina
American expatriate basketball people in Bosnia and Herzegovina
American expatriate basketball people in Belarus
American expatriate basketball people in Belgium
American expatriate basketball people in China
American expatriate basketball people in France
American expatriate basketball people in Germany
American expatriate basketball people in Israel
American expatriate basketball people in Paraguay
American expatriate basketball people in Uruguay
Basketball players from New York (state)
BCM Gravelines players
BC Tsmoki-Minsk players
Boca Juniors basketball players
Centers (basketball)
Israeli Basketball Premier League players
Nanterre 92 players
Maccabi Haifa B.C. players
Power forwards (basketball)
Sportspeople from Schenectady, New York
UMass Minutemen basketball players
HKK Široki players
American men's basketball players